Events in 1968 in Japanese television.

Debuts

Ongoing shows
Music Fair, music (1964-present)
Hyokkori Hyō Tanjima, anime (1964-1969)

Endings

See also
1968 in anime
1968 in Japan
List of Japanese films of 1968

References